Cuthbertson is a surname. Notable people with the surname include: 

Adam Cuthbertson, Australian rugby league player
Allan Cuthbertson (1920–1988), Australian actor
Andrew S. Cuthbertson (1873–1933), American politician and lawyer
Catherine Cuthbertson, British novelist (fl. first half of 19th century)
David Cuthbertson (1900–1989), Scottish biochemist and nutritionist
George Adrian Cuthbertson (1898–1969), Canadian artist
Iain Cuthbertson (1930–2009), Scottish character actor
James Cuthbertson (1851–1910), Scottish–Australian poet and schoolteacher
John Cuthbertson (disambiguation), various people
Lauren Cuthbertson, English ballerina
William Cuthbertson, British Olympic boxing medalist

See also
Culberson (disambiguation)
Culbertson (disambiguation)